Embodied energy is the sum of all the energy required to produce any goods or services, considered as if that energy was incorporated or 'embodied' in the product itself. The concept can be useful in determining the effectiveness of energy-producing or energy saving devices, or the "real" replacement cost of a building, and, because energy-inputs usually entail greenhouse gas emissions, in deciding whether a product contributes to or mitigates global warming. One fundamental purpose for measuring this quantity is to compare the amount of energy produced or saved by the product in question to the amount of energy consumed in producing it.

Embodied energy is an accounting method which aims to find the sum total of the energy necessary for an entire product lifecycle. Determining what constitutes this lifecycle includes assessing the relevance and extent of energy into raw material extraction, transport, manufacture, assembly, installation, disassembly, deconstruction and/or decomposition as well as human and secondary resources.

History
The history of constructing a system of accounts which records the energy flows through an environment can be traced back to the origins of accounting itself. As a distinct method, it is often associated with the Physiocrat's "substance" theory of value, and later the agricultural energetics of Sergei Podolinsky, a Russian physician, and the ecological energetics of Vladmir Stanchinsky.

The main methods of embodied energy accounting as they are used today grew out of Wassily Leontief's input-output model and are called Input-Output Embodied Energy analysis. Leontief's input-output model was in turn an adaptation of the neo-classical theory of general equilibrium with application to "the empirical study of the quantitative interdependence between interrelated economic activities". According to Tennenbaum Leontief's Input-Output method was adapted to embodied energy analysis by Hannon to describe ecosystem energy flows. Hannon's adaptation tabulated the total direct and indirect energy requirements (the energy intensity) for each output made by the system. The total amount of energies, direct and indirect, for the entire amount of production was called the embodied energy.

Methodologies
Embodied energy analysis is interested in what energy goes to supporting a consumer, and so all energy depreciation is assigned to the final demand of consumer. Different methodologies use different scales of data to calculate energy embodied in products and services of nature and human civilization. International consensus on the appropriateness of data scales and methodologies is pending. This difficulty can give a wide range in embodied energy values for any given material. In the absence of a comprehensive global embodied energy public dynamic database, embodied energy calculations may omit important data on, for example, the rural road/highway construction and maintenance needed to move a product, marketing, advertising, catering services, non-human services and the like. Such omissions can be a source of significant methodological error in embodied energy estimations.  Without an estimation and declaration of the embodied energy error, it is difficult to calibrate the sustainability index, and so the value of any given material, process or service to environmental and economic processes.

Standards
The SBTool, UK Code for Sustainable Homes was, and USA LEED still is, a method in which the embodied energy of a product or material is rated, along with other factors, to assess a building's environmental impact. Embodied energy is a concept for which scientists have not yet agreed absolute universal values because there are many variables to take into account, but most agree that products can be compared to each other to see which has more and which has less embodied energy. Comparative lists (for an example, see the University of Bath Embodied Energy & Carbon Material Inventory) contain average absolute values, and explain the factors which have been taken into account when compiling the lists.

Typical embodied energy units used are MJ/kg (megajoules of energy needed to make a kilogram of product), t (tonnes of carbon dioxide created by the energy needed to make a kilogram of product). Converting MJ to t is not straightforward because different types of energy (oil, wind, solar, nuclear and so on) emit different amounts of carbon dioxide, so the actual amount of carbon dioxide emitted when a product is made will be dependent on the type of energy used in the manufacturing process. For example, the Australian Government gives a global average of 0.098 t = 1 GJ. This is the same as 1 MJ = 0.098 kg = 98 g or 1 kg = 10.204 MJ.

Related methodologies
In the 2000s drought conditions in Australia have generated interest in the application of embodied energy analysis methods to water. This has led to use of the concept of embodied water.

Data
A range of databases exist for quantifying the embodied energy of goods and services, including materials and products. These are based on a range of different data sources, with variations in geographic and temporal relevance and system boundary completeness. One such database is the Environmental Performance in Construction (EPiC) Database developed at The University of Melbourne, which includes embodied energy data for over 250 mainly construction materials. This database also includes values for embodied water and greenhouse gas emissions.
The main reason for differences in embodied energy data between databases is due to the source of data and methodology used in their compilation. Bottom-up 'process' data is typically sourced from product manufacturers and suppliers. While this data is generally more reliable and specific to particular products, the methodology used to collect process data typically results in much of the embodied energy of a product being excluded, mainly due to the time, costs and complexity of data collection. Top-down environmentally-extended input-output (EEIO) data, based on national statistics can be used to fill these data gaps. While EEIO analysis of products can be useful on its own for initial scoping of embodied energy, it is generally much less reliable than process data and rarely relevant for a specific product or material. Hence, hybrid methods for quantifying embodied energy have been developed, using available process data and filling any data gaps with EEIO data. Databases that rely on this hybrid approach, such as The University of Melbourne's EPiC Database, provide a more comprehensive assessment of the embodied energy of products and materials.

In common materials
Selected data from the Inventory of Carbon and Energy ('ICE') prepared by the University of Bath (UK)

In transportation 
Theoretically, embodied energy stands for the energy used to extract materials from mines, to manufacture vehicles, assemble, transport, maintain, transform them and to transport energy, and ultimately to recycle these vehicles. Besides, the energy needed to build and maintain transport networks, whether road or rail, should be taken into account as well. The process to be implemented is so complex that no one dares to put forward a figure.

According to the :fr:Institut du développement durable et des relations internationales, in the field of transportation, "it is striking to note that we consume more embodied energy in our transportation expenditures than direct energy [...]. Put in other words, we consume less energy to move around in our personal vehicles than we consume the energy we need to produce, sell and transport the cars, trains or buses we use ".

Jean-Marc Jancovici advocates a carbon footprint analysis of any transportation infrastructure project, prior to its construction.

In automobiles

Manufacturing 
According to  Volkswagen, the embodied energy contents of a Golf A3 with a petrol engine amounts to 18 000 kWh (i.e. 12%  of  545 GJ as shown in the report). A  Golf A4 (equipped with a turbocharged direct injection) will show an embodied energy amounting to 22 000 kWh (i.e. 15% of 545 GJ as shown in the report). According to the French energy and environment agency ADEME  a motor car has an embodied energy contents of 20 800 kWh whereas an electric vehicle shows an embodied energy contents amounting to 34 700 kWh.

An electric car has a higher embodied energy than a combustion engine one, owing to the battery and electronics. According to Science & Vie, the embodied energy of batteries is so high that rechargeable hybrid cars constitute the most appropriate solution, with their batteries smaller than those of an all-electric car.

Fuel 
As regards energy itself, the factor energy returned on energy invested (EROEI) of fuel can be estimated at 8, which means that to some amount of useful energy provided by fuel should be added 1/7 of that amount in embodied energy of the fuel. In other words, the fuel consumption should be augmented by 14.3% due to the fuel EROEI.

According to some authors, to produce 6 liters of petrol requires 42 kWh of embodied energy (which corresponds to approximately 4.2 liters of diesel in terms of energy content).

Road construction 
We have to work here with figures, which prove still more difficult to obtain. In the case of road construction, the embodied energy would amount to 1/18 of the fuel consumption (i.e. 6%).

Other figures available 
Treloar, et al. have estimated the embodied energy in an average automobile in Australia as 0.27 terajoules (i.e. 75 000 kWh) as one component in an overall analysis of the energy involved in road transportation.

In buildings 

Although most of the focus for improving energy efficiency in buildings has been on their operational emissions, it is estimated that about 30% of all energy consumed throughout the lifetime of a building can be in its embodied energy (this percentage varies based on factors such as age of building, climate, and materials).  In the past, this percentage was much lower, but as much focus has been placed on reducing operational emissions (such as efficiency improvements in heating and cooling systems), the embodied energy contribution has come much more into play. Examples of embodied energy include: the energy used to extract raw resources, process materials, assemble product components, transport between each step, construction, maintenance and repair, deconstruction and disposal. As such, it is important to employ a whole-life carbon accounting framework in analyzing the carbon emissions in buildings.

In the energy field

EROEI 
EROEI (Energy Returned On Energy Invested) provides a basis for evaluating the embodied energy due to energy.

Given an EROEI amounting to eight e.g., a seventh of the final energy corresponds to the embodied energy.

Not only that, for really obtaining overall embodied energy, embodied energy due to the construction and maintenance of power plants should be taken into account, too. Here, figures are badly needed.

Electricity 
In the BP Statistical Review of World Energy June 2018, toe are converted into kWh "on the basis of thermal equivalence assuming 38% conversion efficiency in a modern thermal power station".

In France, by convention, the ratio between  primary energy and final energy in electricity amounts to 2.58, corresponding to  an efficiency of 38.8%.

In Germany, on the contrary, because of the swift development of the renewable energies, the ratio between  primary energy and final energy in electricity amounts to only 1.8, corresponding to an efficiency of 55.5%.

According to EcoPassenger, overall electricity efficiency would amount to 34% in the UK, 36% in Germany and 29% in France.

Data processing 

According to association négaWatt, embodied energy related to digital services amounted to 3.5 TWh/a for networks and 10.0 TWh/a for data centres (half for the servers per se, i. e. 5 TWh/a, and the other half for the buildings in which they are housed, i. e. 5 TWh/a), figures valid in France, in 2015. The organization is optimistic about the evolution of the energy consumption in the digital field, underlining the technical progress being made. The Shift Project, chaired by Jean-Marc Jancovici, contradicts the optimistic vision of the association négaWatt, and notes that the digital energy footprint is growing at 9% per year.

See also

Biophysical economics
Ecological economics
Embodied emissions
Energy accounting
Energy cannibalism
Energy economics
Environmental accounting
Life cycle assessment
Systems ecology

References

Bibliography

External links
Embodied energy data and research at The University of Melbourne
Research on embodied energy at the University of Sydney, Australia
Australian Greenhouse Office, Department of the Environment and Heritage
University of Bath (UK), Inventory of Carbon & Energy (ICE) Material Inventory

Energy development
Systems ecology
Ecological economics
Russian inventions
Management cybernetics